Flying Colours is the fourth studio album by Canadian rapper Shad, released in Canada on October 15, 2013.

The album was a shortlisted nominee for the 2014 Polaris Music Prize.

Reception

Flying Colours garnered generally positive reviews from music critics. Tabassum Siddiqui of NOW gave high praise to the versatile production and lyrical delivery made throughout the album, concluding that "the result is a record that fully reveals all of Shad's musical colours." Jacob Lorinc of The Varsity praised the lyrical content for tackling socio-political topics without coming across as obvious and trite when going for positivity, saying that "Although he is still an underdog in the world of hip-hop, Shad’s clever rhymes and intricately woven verses throughout Flying Colours show the rapper’s ability to cover all sorts of ground on this album." Aaron Matthews of Exclaim! said that despite some out-of-place tracks, he praised the album for its vast use of different genres and instruments, and Shad's continued growth as a mature rapper, calling it "a wake-up call to anyone sleeping on Canadian rappers and Shad's coming for the crown next time." Flying Colours was named the 49th best Canadian album of the 2010s, by Exclaim!.

Track listing

Personnel
Adapted from the Flying Colours liner notes.

 Bryden Baird – trumpets
 Trent Reschney – saxophones
 Sebastian Ostertag – cello
 Allison Stewart – viola
 Tanya Charles – violin
 Ian Koiter – string arrangements, bass, keyboards, synths, acoustic guitar
 Max Zipursky – synths, pianos
 Michael Libis – acoustic guitar, electric guitar
 Shad – electric guitar
 Skratch Bastid – drum programming
 Andrew Hootsalack – drum programming
 Jahmal Tonge – live drums
 Ayo Leilani – additional vocals
 Elijah Walsh – engineer
 Crispin Day – engineer
 Rob Stefanson – engineer
 Elisa Pangseng – engineer
 Michael Tompkins – engineer
 Dan Weston – mixer
 Tom Coyne – mastering
 Justin Broadbent – album art, photography

Charts

References

External links
 
 

2013 albums
Shad (rapper) albums